Don Quixote, Knight Errant is a 2002 Spanish adventure film directed and written by Manuel Gutiérrez Aragón, consisting of an adaptation of the second part of Miguel de Cervantes' Don Quixote. It stars Juan Luis Galiardo and Carlos Iglesias respectively as Don Quixote and Sancho Panza, alongside Santiago Ramos, Fernando Guillén Cuervo, Manuel Manquiña, Kiti Manver, Manuel Alexandre, Juan Diego Botto and Emma Suárez.

Plot 
The plot, an adaptation of Don Quixote part II, selects specific chapters of the novel, primarily underpinning as main narrative lines both the Don Quixote's adventures seeking to disenchant the spell put on Dulcinea and his family's attempts to return him home, with the backdrop of the threat posed by the Turk's fleet.

Cast

Production 
An adaptation of the part II of Don Quixote, the screenplay was penned by the director Manuel Gutiérrez Aragón. Gutiérrez Aragón had already directed (and co-wrote alongside Camilo José Cela) a television series adapting Don Quixote part I in 1991, starring Fernando Rey. The reported budget upon the beginning of filming was 900 million ₧. A Gonafilm production, it also had the participation of Telemadrid, Televisió Valenciana and Castilla-La Mancha Televisión.

Release 
The film screened out of competition at the 59th Venice International Film Festival in September 2002. Distributed by Alta Classics, it was theatrically released in Spain on 8 November 2002.

Accolades 

|-
| align = "center" rowspan = "5" | 2003 || rowspan = "5" | 17th Goya Awards || Goya Award for Best Adapted Screenplay || Manuel Gutiérrez Aragón ||  || rowspan = "5" | 
|-
| Best Actor || Juan Luis Galiardo || 
|-
| Best New Actor || Carlos Iglesias || 
|-
| Best Cinematography || José Luis Alcaine || 
|-
| Best Art Direction || Félix Murcia || 
|}

See also 
 List of Spanish films of 2002

References 

Films based on Don Quixote
2000s Spanish-language films
2000s adventure films
Spanish adventure films
Films shot in Castilla–La Mancha
2000s Spanish films